Good & Evil is an American sitcom and soap opera parody which was broadcast in the United States on ABC from September 25 to October 30, 1991. The series was created by Susan Harris, and produced by Witt/Thomas/Harris Productions in association with Touchstone Television.

Series overview
Good & Evil was the saga of two sisters – one "good", the other "evil" – and the backstabbing, jealously and power struggles that occurred between them. Teri Garr starred as Denise Sandler, the evil sister, who was heir to her mother Charlotte (Marian Seldes)'s cosmetics empire Sandler Cosmetics. She was icy and cutthroat, and took great delight at work in mistreating her secretary Mary (Mary Gillis) and her flamboyant secretary Roger (Sherman Howard). Feeling slighted by her family, Denise was out to steal what she thought was rightfully hers, beginning with presidency of the company. Her mother Charlotte, vain and caught up in her own legacy, still ruled over it with an iron fist. However, she promised to give Denise the helm when she reached retirement age, but only when she "looked" 65 (her line of products made her look generations younger, in her eyes, at least). This was only the first motivation in Denise's extensive plotting. One of these plans was soon to include that of the man she felt destined to marry, dashing boyfriend Dr. Eric Haan (Lane Davies).

Meanwhile, the "good" sister, Genevieve "Genny" (Margaret Whitton), was a world-class biochemist who was putting her life together after the death of her husband, and hard at work testing new potential viruses that could be wiped out before they spread the world. A purist, Genny preferred to do lab testing on herself instead of on animals. 

Genny did have her concerns, she couldn't understand why her beautiful daughter Caroline (Brooke Theiss) had been mute since the time of her father's death. In an effort to move on, Genny began seeing George (Mark Blankfield), a clumsy blind psychiatrist at her university, who soon had her fighting off his romantic advances. George's presence and his constant following of Genny was awkward to deal with, as his ineptitude with a cane caused him to demolish everything in sight.

Things became strenuous between Denise and  Genny when the latter was introduced to Dr. Eric. They instantly fell for each other, and before long gave in to their temptations and struck up an affair. When Denise witnessed this unfold, she threatened to blackmail Dr. Eric with lewd photos, so that Genny would disapprove of his "seedy" behavior and dump him. This intensified the feud between the two sisters, with Denise's harsh intentions versus Genny's resilience being the core conflict. Charlotte, who still couldn't accept that she was looking closer to her actual age, decided to retire, but passed over the presidency to her new Southern boyfriend, Harlan Shell (Lane Smith), a billionaire who just purchased the company. Denise added Harlan to her "revenge list", and eventually plotted murder against him.

In the series premiere, Denise's husband Ronald (Marius Weyers), who had been presumed dead after a fall off Mount Everest four years earlier, was found to have remained frozen on the mountain and was thawed out by mountain climbers. Remarkably, Ronald remained physically unharmed but reassimilated back into society with revenge on his mind. He gave Denise and their teenage son David (Seth Green) a surprise homecoming, but it was quickly hinted that it was Denise who had in fact pushed Ronald off the cliff. During the course of the series, she had to keep Ronald's return a secret from everyone else and went to great lengths to get rid of him. As Denise's evil plotting continued, David went on a search for the man he knew was his real father, lawyer Sonny (William Shockley). 

In the final episode to air, Denise successfully blackmailed Dr. Eric, and with his career at stake, Genny broke off their engagement. Caroline spoke for the first time since the loss of her father, as the half-hour came to a close, Denise was attempting to take Harlan's life. This cliffhanger would left unresolved as Good & Evil was cancelled.

Similarities to Soap and controversy
Despite being created by Susan Harris, who in the 1970s launched the wildly successful soap opera parody Soap, Good & Evil shared none of Soaps success.

The ineptitude that George, the blind character, demonstrated in attempting to navigate his surroundings, frequently demolishing everything in sight with his red-tipped white cane, led to the picketing of ABC's offices by members of the Baltimore-based National Federation of the Blind. ABC insisted that the program was not intended to be in any way realistic but rather a "parody done to the extremes, and there is not a single character in the show intended to be believable." Their boycott persuaded two advertisers, Unilever United States, Inc., and Playtex Family Products Corp, to pull their advertising from the program. After airing six episodes and ranking 77 out of 101 shows, Good & Evil became the first cancelled series of the 1991–1992 season.

Unaired episodes
Prior to ABC's cancellation of the show, 11 full episodes of Good & Evil had been produced.  In the last five, still-unaired episodes, Denise murdered Harlan, launching a huge investigation that put everyone on edge. Imperious mother Charlotte came out of retirement and regained control of the company, while Denise continued to fight for her own control.

Cast and characters

Episodes

Sources
Brooks, Tim and Marsh, Earle, The Complete Directory to Prime Time Network and Cable TV Shows

References

External links 
 

American Broadcasting Company original programming
1990s American sitcoms
1991 American television series debuts
1991 American television series endings
Television series by ABC Studios
English-language television shows